The Temple University School of Podiatric Medicine is a podiatric medical school associated with Temple University in Philadelphia, Pennsylvania.  The school is located at 8th and Race Streets in downtown Philadelphia. The school was founded in 1963 as the Pennsylvania College of Podiatric Medicine (PCPM). The school runs the Foot and Ankle Institute, the largest podiatric medical clinic in Philadelphia.

History
TUSPM was opened in September 1963 as the Pennsylvania College of Podiatric Medicine (PCPM). Temple had operated a "School of Chiropody" from 1943 to 1960 and after it closed several former members of the faculty obtained a charter from the Commonwealth of Pennsylvania to open a new podiatric medical school. PCPM existed in rented facilities for its first few years, and moved into its own center at 8th and Pine streets in 1965. When the current campus opened in 1973, it was the first facility ever developed specifically for podiatric use. In addition to classrooms and labs, the complex includes student housing building and a medical clinic, known as the Foot and Ankle Institute. PCPM merged with Temple in July 1998.

Shoe Museum
The TUSPM Shoe Museum includes roughly 900 pairs of shoes, 250 of which are on display on the sixth floor of the college building. The museum was created during the nation's bicentennial in 1976 as an added attraction for visitors to the Liberty Bell and Independence Park, which are only two blocks from the college. A group of volunteers sought additions to the college's collection, and the Mütter Museum of the College of Physicians of Philadelphia placed the Dr. H. Augustus Wilson Shoe Collection on extended loan at the college. Dr. Wilson (1853–1919), a noted Philadelphia orthopedist, was a world traveler and collected footwear from over 30 nations.

Citations

Podiatric Medicine, School of
Podiatric medical schools in the United States
Educational institutions established in 1963
Shoe museums
Educational institutions established in 1895
1963 establishments in Pennsylvania